Michael Gunn (born 16 June 1995) is an Australian rugby union player who currently plays as a loose forward for the Queensland Reds in the international Super Rugby competition.

Gunn represented Queensland Schoolboys before being capped at national schoolboy level in 2012.   He has also appeared for the Reds Under-20 and A sides and locally he plays for Easts Tigers in the Queensland Premier Rugby competition.

References

1995 births
Living people
Australian rugby union players
Rugby union flankers
Brisbane City (rugby union) players
Queensland Reds players
Rugby union players from Brisbane
People educated at Anglican Church Grammar School